{{DISPLAYTITLE:C12H24}}
The molecular formula C12H24 (molar mass: 168.32 g/mol, exact mass: 168.1878 u) may refer to:

 Cyclododecane
 1-Dodecene

Molecular formulas